Edavanna (എടവണ്ണ ) is a town situated in Kerala, near Manjeri Town South India. The town is situated on Calicut–Nilambur–Gudalur state highway and near the banks of the Chaliyar River.  The Koyilandy-Edavanna state highway ends here.

About Village                                                 
Edavanna is a historic village located in the Ernad taluk of Malappuram district in the Indian state of Kerala. It has been a functioning community since before India's independence. The village is situated in the Wandoor block and falls under the North Kerala Division. It is located 22 kilometers north of the district headquarters in Malappuram, 9 kilometers from Wandoor, and 369 kilometers from the state capital, Thiruvananthapuram. The nearest town to Edavan na is Manjeri, which is approximately 11 kilometers away.

Demography 
According to the 2011 Census, the village has a total population of 26432 and 5271 houses. The female population of the village makes up 51.7% of the total population. The village has a high literacy rate of 81.3%, with a female literacy rate of 41.5%. The local language spoken in Edavanna is Malayalam.

Geography 
Edavanna is a village covering an area of 2754 hectares. The village has a population of 26,432 people and around 5,271 houses. The nearest town to Edavanna is Manjeri which is located at a distance of approximately 11 kilometers.

Socio-Economic 
Edavanna village has a diverse population of people from different religious communities such as Muslim, Hindu and Christian. Agriculture, trade and business are the major sources of income for the residents of the village. Additionally, many individuals also work abroad to earn a living.

Ecology 
Edavanna village is located on the banks of Chaliyar Puzha, a major river in Kerala. The presence of the river can cause flooding during the monsoon period, however, the river also makes the village an ecologically important area. The Chaliyar river and nearby hills such as Allangadan Mala and Parangodan Mala add to the natural beauty of the village.

Tourism 
Edavanna village is home to several popular tourist attractions, including the Chaliyar River View and the Amazon View Point. These scenic locations offer visitors the opportunity to take in the natural beauty of the area, including views of the Chaliyar river and the surrounding hills.

Educational Institutions in  Edavanna

Colleges  

 Jamia Nadwiya Arts & Science College

Schools 

 SHMG VHSS Edavanna
 IOHSS EDAVANNA
 Jamia Nadwiyya Residential High School
 AMAUPS KUNDUTHODE
 Government Upper Primary School, Pathappiriyam

References

External links
 വൊക്കേഷണൽ ഹയർ സെക്കന്ററി സ്കൂൾ . SHMGVHSS -VHSE .

Villages in Malappuram district
Nilambur area